Babette Goes to War is a 1959 French CinemaScope film starring Brigitte Bardot. It was Bardot's first movie since becoming a star where she did not take off her clothes.

Plot
In 1940, during the German invasion of France, a young woman called Babette flees on a boat to England. She is desperate to help the Free French, who end up parachuting her back into the country on a mission to thwart the German invasion of England.

Cast

 Brigitte Bardot as Babette 
 Jacques Charrier as Lt. Gérard de Crécy-Lozère
 Francis Blanche as Commander Obersturmführer aka "Papa Schulz" 
 Hannes Messemer as General Franz von Arenberg
 Ronald Howard as Colonel Fitzpatrick
 Yves Vincent as Cpt. Darcy
 Pierre Bertin as Duke Edmond de Crécy-Lozère
 Viviane Gosset as Duchess Hélène de Crécy-Lozère
 Mona Goya as Madame Fernande
 Noël Roquevertas Cpt. Gustave Brémont
 Michael Cramer as Heinrich
 Jean Carmetas Antoine
 René Havard as Louis  
 Günter Meisner as the first Gestapo officer
 Jacques Hilling as the French captain
 Charles Bouillaud as Pierrot 
 Alain Bouvette as Emile
 Max Elloy as Firmin
 Robert Berri as Sgt. Hill 
 Jenny Orléans as a girl 
 Philippe Clair as Un résistant

Production
Bardot had meant to make a film in Hollywood called Paris by Night with Frank Sinatra and Roger Vadim but did not want to go to America. Producer Raoul Levy came up with another idea, a film about a young girl who becomes involved with the Resistance called Babette Goes to War. Levy assigned Vadim to work on the script with an American writer. Vadim's film The Night Heaven Fell was released and performed poorly, so Levy replaced Vadim as director with Christian Jacques. 

In September 1958 it was announced Peter Viertel was working on the script. By October Christian Jacque was attached as director. David Niven was mentioned as a possible co star.

The film was the first in a three-picture deal Levy had with Columbia, two of which were to star Bardot. The studio would invest $2.5 million. (Columbia helped finance the hugely successful Bardot-Levy movie And God Created Woman.) Gerard Philippe was the original co star announced. This deal later expanded to cover three years.

Levy said he came up with the idea of Bardot keeping on her clothes because it was unexpected. "Everything there is to show has been shown," said the producer.

Filming took place in February and March 1959. Bardot and Jacques Charrier had an affair during filming that led to Bardot falling pregnant and them getting married. Bardot was briefly ill during filming.

Reception
The film had its world premiere at the Moscow Film Festival. It was a big hit with admissions in France of 4,657,610. It was the fourth most popular film at the French box office in 1959, after The Cow and I, Sleeping Beauty and The Green Mare. (It was followed by Some Like It Hot, The Four Hundred Blows, The Magnificent Tramp, North by Northwest, Solomon and Sheba and Black Orpheus.

References

External links

Babette Goes to War at TCMDB

1959 films
Films directed by Christian-Jaque
Films with screenplays by Michel Audiard
Columbia Pictures films
French war comedy films
CinemaScope films
1950s French-language films
1950s French films